Eugène Droulers (30 July 1917 – 14 April 1945) was a Frenchman who was active in the French Resistance during World War II and a pilot Mort pour la France during Ardennes-Alsace Campaign on his Piper J-3 Cub. He was posthumously awarded the "Croix de Chevalier" of the Legion of Honour in 1946.

Honours and awards

Escapees' Medal
Resistance Medal
War Cross 1939–1945
Knight of the Legion of Honour

References

French Resistance members
Chevaliers of the Légion d'honneur
1945 deaths
French World War II pilots
1917 births
Resistance members killed by Nazi Germany
French military personnel killed in World War II